, were a Japanese J-pop duo consisting of Halca and Yucali  from Meguro, Tokyo, Japan. Their debut album, Halcali Bacon, reached #5 on the Oricon charts, making it the first album by a female hip-hop artist to enter the top ten in Japanese history.

Halcali also made their American debut in May 2008 as the musical guests of honor at the Anime Central convention. They performed again in America at Central Park, New York City on June 1, 2008 as part of a Japan Day Festival as part of a Japanese tourism campaign.

As Halcali did not renew their contracts with Epic Records Japan, they have had no outstanding entertainment activity as a unit as of 2013.

Creation

Pre-debut 
Haruka and Yukari were close friends since elementary school and also attended the same local Meguro dance school. Both girls were only interested in becoming dancers in the future and had no aspiration to become singers.
In 2002, Haruka and Yukari noticed a pink flier for an audition to become a "female hip hop unit" which was held by the group Rip Slyme. Yukari admitted that the both of them entered the competition simply to see what it was.
Among hundreds of entrants, Haruka and Yukari were chosen to form Halcali. The girls modestly spoke of their formation, saying that although there were many girls cuter than themselves, Rip Slyme and Oshare Toy Factory riskily chose them. Yukari stated, "Sometimes it's like you want to have a piece of really gross gum- Just to see!"

Debut 
Halcali debuted at a free concert held by Rip Slyme at the Budokan theatre. There, Halcali performed with Rip Slyme and were introduced along with their debut single, .
"Tandem" was released on January 8, 2003 and was marketed on several Japanese television networks, along with MTV. The single entered into the Oricon Charts at position 19.

The time between the release of their first single to that of their debut album Halcali moved away from mainstream J-pop and toward a style combining pop and rap; an airy, self-parody "bubblegum" rap in the vein of earlier groups such as East End X Yuri. This was evident in their second and third singles,  and  released in mid-2003. Both singles focused on rap rather than pop.

The latter song attracted attention from Western audiences when it appeared on Adam and Joe Go Tokyo.

Discography

Studio albums
 Halcali Bacon (2003)
 Ongaku no Susume (2004)
 Cyborg Oretachi (2007)
 'Tokyo Groove (2010)
 Halcali no Okawari'' (2012)

Singles
 "Tandem" (2003)
 "Electric Sensei" (2003)
 "GiriGiri Surf Rider" (2003)
 "Strawberry Chips" (2003)
 "Marching March" (2004)
 "Baby Blue!" (2004)
 "Tip Taps Tip" (2005)
 "Twinkle Star" (2006)
 "Look" (2006)
 "Tougenkyou / Lights, Camera. Action!" (2007)
 "It's Party Time!" (2007)
 "Long Kiss Good Bye" (2008)
 "Re:Yasashii Kimochi" (2009)
 "Konya wa Boogie Back" (2009)
 "Endless Night / YES" (2010)
 "You May Dream" (2010)
 "Roman Hikou" (2010)

References

External links 

 The Official Halcali Website

Sony Music Entertainment Japan artists
Japanese hip hop groups
Japanese pop music groups
Musical groups established in 2002
Musical groups from Tokyo
2002 establishments in Japan
Japanese musical duos
Pop music duos
Hip hop duos
Female musical duos
Women hip hop groups